Fred Paul (1880–1967) was a Swiss-born British actor and film director. Paul was born in Lausanne in 1880 but moved to Britain at a young age. He was a prolific actor and director in the 1910s and 1920s, but his career dramatically declined with the arrival of sound films.

Selected filmography
Director
 The Dop Doctor (1915)
 Infelice (1915)
 The Second Mrs Tanqueray (1916)
 The Vicar of Wakefield (1916)
 Lady Windermere's Fan (1916)
 Her Greatest Performance (1916)
 The Lyons Mail (1916)
 The Duchess of Seven Dials (1920)
 The House on the Marsh (1920)
 Lady Tetley's Decree (1920)
 The Little Welsh Girl (1920)
 The English Rose (1920)
 Uncle Dick's Darling (1920)
 A Woman Misunderstood (1921)
 If Four Walls Told (1922)
 The Recoil (1924)
 The Last Witness (1925)
 Safety First (1926)
 Thou Fool (1926)
 The Luck of the Navy (1927)
 The Broken Melody (1929)
 In a Lotus Garden (1931)
 Romany Love (1931)

Actor
 East Lynne (1913)
 Sixty Years a Queen (1913)
 Lights of London (1914)
 The Dop Doctor (1915)
 Infelice (1915)
 The Rogues of London (1915)
 A Cinema Girl's Romance (1915)
 John Halifax, Gentleman (1915)
 If Four Walls Told (1922)
 The Right to Strike (1923)
 The Last Witness (1925)

Producer
 Dombey and Son (1917)

References

External links

1880 births
1967 deaths
People from Lausanne
British male film actors
British male silent film actors
British film directors
Swiss emigrants to the United Kingdom
20th-century British male actors